= Philostephanus (poet) =

Greek poet

Philostephanus (Ancient Greek: Φιλοστέφανος) was a Greek poet of the old or middle comedy. Little information about him survives.

Athenaeus preserved a four-line excerpt from the comedy "Delian," in which Philostratus appears to mock the habits of the inhabitants of Delos. The preserved excerpt also mentions the names of two leading cooks of antiquity, Daedalus and Thibron the Athenian.
